Maria da Conceição (died 1798, São Paulo), was an alleged Brazilian witch.

Maria da Conceição was active as a cunning woman. She was known for her great knowledge of medicinal herbs, which she used to manufacture medicine for use in her work as a herbalist physician. She eventually came into conflict with a priest, Father Luis, who was opposed to herbal medicine.

Father Luis accused her of heresy and witchcraft. Maria da Conceição was put on trial in accordance with the Portuguese law against witchcraft. She was judged guilty as charged, and executed by burning.  In 1798, witch trials had long ago disappeared in Europe, but still occurred in Latin America.

References

1798 deaths
People executed for witchcraft
People executed by Portugal by burning
18th-century Brazilian people
18th-century Brazilian women
18th-century executions by Portugal